TGE may refer to:

Ali Raymi, undefeated boxed nicknamed "The Greatest Ever"
Team Global Express, a division of an Australian transportation and logistics company
Torque (game engine), an open-source 3D game engine
Sharpe Field (IATA: TGE), a private American airport
Transient expression, a gene expression
Transitional Government of Ethiopia